Joseph-Benoît Suvée (3 January 1743 – 9 February 1807) was a Flemish painter strongly influenced by French neo-classicism.

Biography
Suvée was born in Bruges. Initially a pupil of Matthias de Visch, he came to France aged 19 and became a pupil of Jean-Jacques Bachelier. In 1771, he won the Prix de Rome.  In Rome from 1772 to 1778, he prolonged the usual duration allowed to pensionaries of the French Academy in Rome.  He was named an academician on his return to Paris and he opened an art school for young women at the Louvre. One of his students was Constance Mayer. He emulated and competed with Jacques-Louis David, earning his enduring hatred.

Named the French Academy in Rome's director in 1792, replacing François-Guillaume Ménageot, he was imprisoned for a while in the Prison Saint-Lazare and only able to take up the post in 1801. After a brilliant career, and a six years' stay in Rome as the Academy's Director, he died there suddenly.

His works include Achilles depositing the body of Hector at the feet of the body of Patroclus, (1769, Louvre), and Cornelia, mother of the Gracchi, (1795, Louvre).

Anna Barbara Bansi, with whom he is said to have had an affair, was another pupil.

Selected paintings

References

External links 

 Works by Suvée at the Louvre
 Graphic works of Suvée in the Flemish Art Collection

1743 births
1807 deaths
Belgian neoclassical painters
18th-century Flemish painters
18th-century French painters
French male painters
19th-century Flemish painters
19th-century French painters
Artists from Bruges
Prix de Rome for painting
19th-century French male artists
18th-century French male artists